2C-D (2,5-dimethoxy-4-methylphenethylamine or 2C-M) is a psychedelic drug of the 2C family that is sometimes used as an entheogen. It was first synthesized in 1970 by a team from the Texas Research Institute of Mental Sciences, and its activity was subsequently investigated in humans by Alexander Shulgin. In his book PiHKAL, Shulgin lists the dosage range as being from 20 to 60 mg. Lower doses of 10 mg or less have been explored for microdosing.

Not much information is known about the toxicity of 2C-D, as no major studies have been conducted. According to Shulgin, the effects of 2C-D typically last for 4–6 hours. Shulgin himself referred to this substance as a “pharmacological tofu,” meaning that when mixed with other substances, it can extend or potentiate their effects without coloring the experience too much, in a manner similar to how tofu absorbs the flavors of sauces or spices it is cooked with. Hanscarl Leuner, working in Germany, explored the use of 2C-D under the name LE-25 in psychotherapeutic research.

Drug prohibition laws

China
As of October 2015 2C-D is a controlled substance in China.

Canada
As of October 31, 2016; 2C-D is a controlled substance (Schedule III) in Canada.

Denmark
2C-D is added to the list of Schedule B controlled substances.

Germany
2C-D is an Anlage I controlled drug.

Sweden
Sveriges riksdags health ministry  classified 2C-D as "health hazard" under the act  (Act on the Prohibition of Certain Goods Dangerous to Health) as of Mar 1, 2005,  in their regulation SFS 2005:26 listed as "2,5-dimetoxi-4-metylfenetylamin (2C-D)", making it illegal to sell or possess.

United States
2C-D became a Schedule I Controlled Substance in the United States as of July 9, 2012, with the signing of Food and Drug Administration Safety and Innovation Act. On a state level, both Oklahoma and Pennsylvania list 2C-D under schedule I.

References

2C (psychedelics)
Designer drugs
Substances discovered in the 1970s